Ravi Gossain is an Indian actor and works for movies and TV serials. He has worked in serials like Amanat as Nigoda and Sarhadein as Sohail and on Zee TV's Fear Files: Darr Ki Sacchi Tasvirein. He got recognized for his role in the 1996 Hindi movie Maachis, where he played the character of Kuldip and recently in Shootout at Lokhandwala as Aslam Chikna. Ravi Gossain  along with actor Priya Arya also heads a production house called Spicy Smile India Pvt Ltd.

Filmography

References

External links

Indian male film actors
Living people
Actors and filmmakers work group articles needing attention
Year of birth missing (living people)